William Courthope may refer to several people of the Courthope family:

William Courthope (MP) for Hastings (UK Parliament constituency)
William Courthope (officer of arms) (1808–1866), English  genealogist and herald
William John Courthope, writer and historian